Steven Grossman (born February 17, 1946) is an American businessman and former Treasurer and Receiver-General of Massachusetts and candidate for Governor of Massachusetts. Grossman previously served as chairman of the Massachusetts Democratic Party from 1991 to 1992, president of the American Israel Public Affairs Committee (AIPAC) from 1992 to 1996 and chairman of the Democratic National Committee from 1997 to 1999. In the spring of 2015, Grossman became the CEO of the Initiative for a Competitive Inner City, a Boston-based nonprofit focused on strengthening inner city economies that was founded by Harvard Business School professor Michael Porter.

Prior to his involvement in politics, Grossman worked at Goldman Sachs.  In 1975 he left Goldman Sachs to work in his family business, a paper supplier called Massachusetts Envelope Company, now the Grossman Marketing Group.

In 2012 Grossman was named number 47 on a list of the 100 most influential institutional investors worldwide by the Asset International magazine.

Education and military service
Grossman received his bachelor's degree in Romance languages from Princeton University in 1967, and his Master of Business Administration degree from Harvard Business School in 1969, where he was a Baker Scholar.

He served in the Army Reserve during the 1970s, and his South Boston unit numbered among its members Thomas P. O'Neill III, Ed Markey, and Markey's brothers Richard and John.

Political career
From 1991 to 1992, he was chairman of the Massachusetts Democratic Party, also serving as chairman of the American Israel Public Affairs Committee from 1992 to 1996. From 1997 to 1999, he was the chairman of the Democratic National Committee.

He ran unsuccessfully for Governor of Massachusetts in 2002, losing the Democratic nomination to Shannon O'Brien with 0.80% of the vote in the Democratic Primary.  He had announced his withdrawal from the race over the summer, but too late to remove his name from the ballot.

He was elected to succeed Tim Cahill as state treasurer in November 2010, defeating Republican State Representative Karyn Polito.

2014 gubernatorial campaign

On July 13, 2013, Grossman declared his candidacy for Massachusetts Governor.

On April 17, 2014, Grossman faced off against Gun Owners' Action League of Massachusetts Executive Director Jim Wallace in a debate over tougher gun control laws.

On June 14, 2014, Grossman won the endorsement of the Massachusetts Democratic Party at the Democratic State Convention in Worcester, Massachusetts, where he received the most support by a wide margin.

Grossman received strong support from the LGBT community during his campaign, including the endorsement of all five LGBT state legislators: State Senator and Majority Leader Stan Rosenberg, Representative Denise Andrews, Representative Elizabeth Malia, Representative Kate Hogan, and Representative Sarah Peake. Grossman's broad base of support included endorsements by unions such as the United Union of Roofers, Waterproofers and Allied Workers Local 33 and Teamsters Local 122 as well as advocacy organizations such as Mass Retirees and the Coalition for Social Justice.

During the campaign Grossman also received support from the Mass Forward Super PAC, which became the first Super PAC subject to a new state campaign finance disclosure law that requires the top five donors names be included on advertising materials. In the disclosure, Grossman's mother, Shirley Grossman's name appeared as one of those donors.

On September 9, 2014, Grossman ended his gubernatorial campaign after losing the Democratic primary to Martha Coakley.

Grossman was a supporter of Mayor Pete Buttigieg's 2020 presidential campaign.

Personal life
He is married to Barbara Wallace Grossman a professor of theater at Tufts University, and they have three children. His daughter-in-law, Becky Walker Grossman, is a city councilor for Newton, Massachusetts and placed third in the Democratic primary race to succeed Rep. Joe Kennedy III.

References

External links
 
 Grossman Marketing Group

 

|-

|-

1946 births
20th-century American politicians
American Israel Public Affairs Committee
American marketing people
American people of Romanian-Jewish descent
Democratic National Committee chairs
Harvard Business School alumni
Jewish American people in Massachusetts politics
Living people
Massachusetts Democratic Party chairs
Military personnel from Massachusetts
Princeton University alumni
State treasurers of Massachusetts
United States Army reservists
21st-century American Jews